Karen Gill from Western Australia is an Australian Paralympic athlete.  She won a  silver medal at the 1988 Seoul Games in the Women's Javelin C3 event.

References

External links
 Karen Gill at Australian Athletics Historical Results
 

Paralympic athletes of Australia
Athletes (track and field) at the 1988 Summer Paralympics
Paralympic silver medalists for Australia
Living people
Medalists at the 1988 Summer Paralympics
Year of birth missing (living people)
Paralympic medalists in athletics (track and field)
Australian female javelin throwers